The Chevrolet Chevette is a front-engine, rear-drive subcompact manufactured and marketed by Chevrolet for model years 1976–1987 as a three-door or five-door hatchback.  Introduced in September 1975, the Chevette superseded the Vega as Chevrolet's entry-level subcompact, and sold 2.8 million units over 12 years. The Chevette was the best-selling small car in the U.S. for model years 1979 and 1980.

The Chevette employed General Motors' global T platform. Worldwide, GM manufactured and marketed more than 7 million T-cars  – rebadged variants using the T platform – including the Pontiac Acadian in Canada, Pontiac T1000/1000 in the United States (1981–1987), K-180 in Argentina, Vauxhall Chevette, Opel Kadett, Isuzu Gemini, Holden Gemini, and as a coupe utility (pickup), the Chevy 500. A T-car variant remained in production in South America through 1998.

Introduced on a full-color nationwide campaign in 140–150 of the country's largest daily papers, the New York Times said the "little American car holds its own with the foreigners." Looking back on the Chevette in 2011, the same publication called the Chevette "haphazardly made, sparsely trimmed and underpowered." Consumer Guide described the Chevette as “unimaginative to an extreme.”

Development
Under the direction of chief engineer John Mowrey, Chevrolet began developing the Chevette on December 24, 1973. It was a response to the federal CAFE standards and the 1973 oil crisis. The Chevette was prompted by GM's Energy Task Force, which arose out of the crisis and the resultant shift in consumer demand to smaller, foreign vehicles boasting greater fuel efficiency.

The Chevette used as its basis GM's World Car, "Project 909" – what would become the T-car program, so named because the vehicles shared GM's T platform.  With the well-known problems of its predecessor, the Vega, which included production issues, reliability problems, and a serious propensity for corrosion, the team reworked the international platform such that the Chevette shared not a single body panel with another T-car and reworked the underbody extensively to enhance corrosion protection. The Chevette's 1.4-liter base iron-block engine weighed 59 lb less than the Vega's much-heralded aluminum-block engine.

The first Chevette, a two-door hatchback called the Chevette Scooter, rolled off the assembly line on August 18, 1975  and officially introduced on September 16, in Washington, DC, with the first models going on sale on October 2. , just after new legislation-mandated Corporate Average Fuel Economy (CAFE) standards. With initial projected sales of 275,000 units in its first year, numbers were cut in half as the price of oil stabilized. The Chevette ultimately reached 2,793,353 sales for its entire production across the 12 model years 1976–1987. Global T-car sales  surpassed 7 million in the end.  The last Chevette was manufactured on December 23, 1986, at Lakewood Assembly – following the end of production at Wilmington Assembly in September, 1985.  The last Chevette manufactured was a light-blue two-door hatchback shipped to a Chevrolet dealer in Springdale, Ohio.

The T-car had been launched internationally in Brazil under the Chevette name in 1973, as a two-door sedan and ultimately a four-door sedan, a two-door hatchback, and a two-door station wagon (named "Marajó"), as well as a pickup (named the "Chevy 500"), produced until 1994.

Model years (1976–1987)

The Chevette itself was initially available only as a two-door hatchback with a 1.4-liter OHC or 1.6-liter OHC gasoline inline-four engine. This engine is either a 1.4L Isuzu G140 or 1.6L G161Z. The inline four Isuzu engine had its block cast in Brazil and there is some confusion whether this is a different engine but the twin cam covers solves this issue; this is a Japanese Isuzu motor.
A four-speed manual transmission was standard, while a three-speed automatic transmission was optional. Other features included rack-and-pinion steering, front disc brakes, front stabilizer bar, 13-inch tires, tricolor taillights, front bucket seats, an onboard diagnostic system, extensive acoustic insulation, a single steering column-mounted stalk (integrating controls for signal indicators, wipers, and windshield washers), and factory options including swing-out rear quarter windows, AM/FM radio, analog clock, delayed wipers, and a chrome "Bright Package".  Front seats featured inertia locking mechanisms that enabled entry and exit adjustment of the front seatback without using a separate release.

Pontiac marketed a rebadged variant in Canada as the "Acadian". In addition to being the smallest, most fuel-efficient car marketed by Chevrolet, the Chevette was the lightest car marketed in the U.S. The EPA rated the base 1.4-liter engine at  city and  highway. Chevrolet claimed that the Chevette's turning circle (30.2 feet) was one of the smallest in the world and that it was essentially a "metric" car, "international in design and heritage". The 1976–1978 Chevettes can be identified by round headlights and chrome-rimmed, tricolor taillights.

Chevrolet marketed optional "Rally" and "Woody" packages, as well as the least expensive "Scooter" model. The Chevette Woody (1976) featured simulated wood-grain siding and upgraded interior and exterior trim. The Scooter was offered as a base model with a $2,899 suggested retail price, two front passenger seats, an optional rear seat, deletion of most exterior chrome (e.g., window surrounds), painted rather than chrome bumpers, an open glove box, black carpeting, door-pull straps in lieu of arm rests, fiberboard door panels, and a passenger seat without fore-aft adjustment. A total of 9,810 Scooter models were manufactured, compared to 178,007 regular hatchbacks.

The Scooter hatchback included a rear seat, while offering a rear-seat delete option. The Sandpiper trim package included a “reef”-patterned interior, deluxe door trim, cream gold or antique white exterior colors, and an exterior Sandpiper logo just behind each door.

In 1978, models had a revised grille with a grid design, while the grille and headlight frames were chromed for standard models, a four-door hatchback riding on a  wheelbase was added – two inches longer than the two-door – and this version accounted for more than half of the Chevette's nearly 300,000 sales. The 1.4-liter engine and Woody package were dropped with a fuel door added. A TH-180 automatic transmission was added to replace the THM-200 series automatic. An "HO" (high output) version was available in addition to the standard 1.6-liter, featuring a modified head and a larger valves-cam profile. The HO package also included a dual-outlet exhaust manifold. Prices were dropped and more standard equipment was added for 1978. Air conditioning, radial tires, an AM/FM radio, and power brakes were optional.

In 1979, the Holley two-barrel carburetor became standard on all models. The front fascia was revised with a flat hood, no longer wrapping down to the bumper. New for 1979 was a large chrome grille with Chevrolet's "bow-tie" emblem and rectangular headlights. A new air-injection system was introduced to improve catalytic-converter function at idle. An active passenger-restraint system was introduced in small numbers as an option which featured a lower hanging dashboard, automatic seatbelts, and a center-dash console. Chevette sales totaled more than 451,000 units – a figure that would rank it second only to Chevrolet's new Citation, which had a much longer model run (sales had started in April 1979). Consumer Guide testers managed "an honest 29 mpg in the city and 39 mpg on the highway". The 1980 rear fascia was revised with a squared-off hatch, wraparound taillights with combined, single-colored turn signals, and a round gas-filler door.

In 1981, a diesel engine option was new with a late 1981 availability – this is a 1.8-liter Isuzu unit only available coupled to an Isuzu five-speed. The  powertrain is the same as was installed in the Isuzu I-Mark. It was not available with air conditioning. New styled-steel wheels with center caps were offered, and the previous wheel and hubcap design was discontinued. Domestic models received a new computer command control feedback system on gasoline engines. The HO option was discontinued. Electronic spark timing was used on 1981 models in place of mechanical timing advance. A new engine cylinder head design (swirl-port) was introduced to improve low-end torque and fuel economy. The Pontiac T1000 was introduced in the spring of 1981 for both the U.S. and Canadian markets, which shared all body stampings with the Chevette, featuring a chrome center with black-trimmed grille and headlight buckets, as well as standard chrome window trim with black area fill. The T1000 also had additional fresh-air vents at the outer ends of the dashboard. This gave Canadian Pontiac dealers 2 versions of the T-car: the Acadian and the T1000 (later, simply "1000") concurrently from 1981 to 1985. Power steering was a new option for the Chevette, as well as a 3.36 axle ratio (standard on T1000 models). The active passenger-restraint system was discontinued. New lighter-weight bucket seats were introduced that lacked much of the lower support of the heavier "panned" seats. A new adhesive-based, thinner windshield seal replaced the lock-ring type.

In 1982, models featured a five-speed manual transmission option on gasoline-powered two-door cars (standard with diesel). The Scooter was newly available as a four-door hatchback. New GM THM-180C (THM200C for diesel model) automatic transmissions, which included a locking torque converter for greater fuel mileage, were available. Introduction of a pump-driven AIR system in the late model year replaced PAIR to help efficiency of the catalytic converter. A new catalytic converter was introduced with an air inlet for forced air injection from the air pump. A new one-piece cardboard-based headliner with an updated overhead dome light replaced the earlier vinyl liner. The Pontiac T1000 received a unique grille, body molding, and horizontal lined taillights, as well as an alloy sport wheel option. General Motors of Canada's Pontiac Acadian, a rebadged Chevette, received all the T1000's Pontiac-exclusive features from this point on. Chevrolet sold 433,000 Chevettes in 1981 and 233,000 in 1982.

In 1983, the Chevettes had a makeover for the front and rear fasciae, and the Chevette CS was introduced. A black-finished grille and trim moldings replaced most chrome pieces. Scooter and base Chevettes featured black bumpers and end caps, while the higher-end Chevette CS models included color-keyed bumpers and caps with chrome bumper inserts as an option. Scooter and base models featured a black-only grille and headlight buckets, while CS models featured argent-colored trim. The Chevette S model introduced a cosmetic package that included black-painted styled-steel wheels and a red-accented grille and moldings, as well as oversized decal emblems in red. Front bucket seats featured new adjustable knobs on the sides, but lost the reclining levers of previous years. Interior trim was also blacked out with new black door handles and black plastic window regulators. An integrated cassette deck was optional with the stereo package. A chrome strip on the dashboard was available only on CS and S models until the end of production. Deluxe door panels were discontinued and all models featured plastic door panels, but base and Scooter models still featured laminated cardboard cargo area panels. The "diagnostic connector" was removed from the wiring harness.

In 1984, the low-cost Scooter model was discontinued, but kept for Chevettes made for Canada. The T1000 was renamed Pontiac 1000 in 1983 both in the U.S and Canada. The 1985 models carried few updates from the 1984 models. In 1986, the Chevette base model was discontinued, leaving only the CS and the S, which featured a third brake light and an instrument cluster "service engine soon" light, replacing the "check engine" light.

In 1987, Chevrolet dropped the Chevette S model and the diesel engine option (after 324 were sold in 1986, plus 264 Pontiac 1000). These were the last General Motors diesel passenger cars built for many decades, following the discontinuation of the Oldsmobile Diesel engine. The Chevette's price was also dropped to $4,995. Sales fell to just over 46,000 units, and production ended on December 23, 1986.

Production Figures:

Electrovette
In the 1970s, General Motors Advanced Engineering developed a concept car, the Electrovette, based on the Chevette, but using an electric motor powered by lead-acid batteries.

Leata Cabalero
A luxury variant of the Chevette, the Leata Cabalero, was manufactured and marketed for model years 1975 and 1977 by Stinebaugh Manufacturing Company, founded by Donald E. Stinebaugh (1916–1992) with his son Leonard D. "Sonny" Stinebaugh (1946–2001) in Post Falls, Idaho. Donald Stinebaugh named the car after his wife Hilda (Erickson) Stinebaugh, giving the car her nickname, Leata – a misspelling of lita, Norwegian for "little" in feminine form.

The Leata featured power windows, power seat and cruise control – as well as baroque styling with custom fiberglass body panels, round headlights in square bezels, a rectangular "classic" grille, and heavily styled fenders; 97 were made either in pickup or hatchback body styles.

Latin America

The Chevrolet Chevette was first launched by General Motors (Brazil) in 1973 as a two-door sedan. A four-door sedan followed in April 1978, and then a three-door hatchback was added in November 1979. The hatchback had unique bodywork for Latin America, longer than the European Kadett City and with a notch at the base à la the period Ford Escort. A three-door station wagon version, called the "Marajó" in Brazil, was added in September 1980, as was a sporting version of the hatchback called the 1.6 SR (with a mere four more horsepower, achieved by a somewhat higher compression ratio). In 1983, the Chevette received a thorough facelift with rectangular headlights, with the turn signals located underneath the headlights, a flatter hood, and a single-piece grille. The dash was also new, as were ventilation windows in the front doors. Mechanically, the 1.6 was now also available to run on gasoól and a five-speed manual gearbox was available as an option.

The Latin American Chevettes underwent a series of facelifts, in 1978, 1983, and a major one in 1987, which meant new headlights and a black plastic grille. Where available, the station wagon used the Chevette name outside of Brazil.

The hatchback remained in production until 1988, while the Marajó continued to be available until 1989. Marajó is an island located at the mouth of the Amazon River in Brazil. The four-door sedan version was built until 1989, mainly for export to other Latin American countries. The two-door sedan remained in production until 1993, only outlived by the pickup version (Chevy 500), which continued until 1994 after having been first launched in 1983. The four-door sedan continued to be built for a few more years in Ecuador and Colombia.

The Chevette originally appeared with a 1.4-liter inline-four of Isuzu origins, albeit with a single overhead cam rather than the pushrod model originally used in the United States. In 1981 this was augmented by a locally developed 1.6-liter version, it too with a single carburetor. The Brazilian 1.6 was somewhat larger than the Isuzu-developed G161Z engine used in North America. This engine remained available until the end of Brazilian Chevette production. The lower-powered 1.4 was only available for gasohol as of 1981 and was discontinued entirely after 1982. A gasohol-powered version of the 1.6 appeared in its stead for 1983.

As a tax cut for sub-1-liter cars appeared in late 1990, General Motors do Brasil responded with the 1.0-litre "Chevette Junior" for early 1992. This used a narrow-bore, short-stroke  version of the OHC engine with a catalytic converter. The Junior did not do particularly well in the market, competing against the much more modern Fiat Uno Mille, Volkswagen Gol, and Ford Escort Hobby. It only remained available until 1993, after which the Corsa took over. A 1.8-liter Isuzu diesel-engined version was also built in Uruguay, exclusively for the Uruguayan market. In the Brazilian market, both the 1.4 and the 1.6 were available in gasoline and alcohol versions.

In Argentina, the Kadett C was originally marketed as the Opel K-180, but between 1992 and 1995, the equivalent of the Brazilian Chevette was sold there as the GMC Chevette. Production in Colombia, where a special version for taxi usage was also built, continued until 1998. The Chevette was the number-one seller in Chile for some time, last in 1991. The Chevette was made locally in Chile in 2-door and 4-door form from 1976-1983 while the Marajo station wagon was always imported from Brazil as was the Chevy 500 pickup. After 1983, all Chevettes in Chile were imported from Brazil.  When catalytic converters were made a requirement in that country, GMB was unable to develop such an engine and the Chevette was withdrawn from the Chilean market after the 1992 model year.

Around 1.6 million units were built in Brazil, with the Corsa replacing the Junior and the Chevrolet Kadett/Ipanema replacing the bigger-engined versions. About one quarter of the production was exported.

Chevy 500

The Chevrolet Chevy 500 was the coupé utility version of the Brazilian Chevette. Launched in 1983, it was the precursor to the Classic/Corsa/Montana lineup of today. It competed with offerings from several other manufacturers, including the Fiat Fiorino, Ford Pampa, and Volkswagen Saveiro. Using the 1.6-liter OHC inline four rated at 70 hp, this model continued in production until 1994, and was the last Chevette version built in Brazil, where it was replaced by the coupé utility version of Chevrolet Corsa.

Grumett
Created by Horacio Torrendell, a fibreglass-bodied version (actually based on the Vauxhall Chevette's bodywork) called the Grumett was built in Uruguay. It was available either as a station wagon, as a pickup, or as a double-cab pickup. This replaced an earlier version (since 1976) which used bodywork based on that of the Vauxhall Viva, as well as Vauxhall mechanics. By 1980 the Vauxhall parts had become impossible to import and Grumett switched to Chevette parts from Brazil. The Grumett used the original 1.4-liter version of the Chevette engine. The regular Chevette was also assembled in Uruguay, by General Motors Uruguaya. It was sold there as a two- or four-door sedan, either with the 1.4 petrol or the 1.8 diesel.

Gallery

References

External links

Cars of Brazil
Chevette
Rear-wheel-drive vehicles
Subcompact cars
Hatchbacks
Coupé utilities
Cars introduced in 1976
1980s cars
1990s cars
Motor vehicles manufactured in the United States